Taoufik Charfeddine (Arabic: توفيق شرف الدين ) (born 24 November 1968) is a Tunisian politician. He was Minister of Interior in the Bouden Cabinet. He served in the same role in the Mechichi Cabinet. On March 17, 2023, Taoufik Charfeddine announced his resignation from the post of Minister of the Interior.. He was replaced by Kamal Feki.

References 

1968 births
Living people
21st-century Tunisian politicians
Independent politicians in Tunisia
Interior ministers of Tunisia
Tunisian Muslims
University of Sousse alumni